Adrienne King (born July 21, 1960) is an American actress and artist. She made her film debut in the television film Inherit the Wind (1965)—followed by uncredited roles in Between the Lines (1977), Saturday Night Fever (1977), and Hair (1979). 

She is best known for portraying Alice Hardy in the Friday the 13th franchise—appearing in Friday the 13th (1980), Friday the 13th Part 2 (1981), and the fan film Jason Rising (2021). In 2023, showrunner Bryan Fuller confirmed King would have an undisclosed recurring role in his upcoming Friday the 13th Peacock prequel series Crystal Lake.

After starring in the original Friday the 13th, King became the target of a stalker and retired from acting for three decades—beginning her career as a ADR looper and developing her skills as an artist. In 2010, she returned to acting in the low-budget horror film Psychic Experiment. King followed this with roles in The Butterfly Room (2012), Tales of Poe (2014), and Killer Therapy (2019). King is the narrator of the audiobook of Grady Hendrix's novel The Final Girl Support Group (2021).

Life and career

1960–1979: Early life and roles
King was born July 21, 1960 in Oyster Bay, Long Island, New York. She is a first-generation American; her mother was English and from Liverpool, and her father was of Hungarian Jewish and Czech descent. King's mother put her into acting at 6-months old in commercials alongside her brother and sister, something she describes as her not having much control over. In 1965 around age five, she appeared in the television film Inherit the Wind in a supporting role. Beginning in ninth grade, she began auditioning for films in New York City: "As long as I kept my grades up, everyone was cool with it," she recalled.

She soon began training under Bill Esper, a student of acting instructor Sanford Meisner. She began to obtain parts in soap operas, Off-off-Broadway productions, and in several television commercials most notably Burger King advertising. Additionally, she worked as an extra, as well as performing as an uncredited dancer in the films Saturday Night Fever (1977) and Hair (1979). She also had a small supporting role in the comedy film Between the Lines (1977). During this time, she studied art at New York's Fashion Institute of Technology.

1980–2008: Friday the 13th and after
In 1979, while King was appearing in a commercial for Burger King, she was referred to producer Sean S. Cunningham through a mutual friend for a role in his directorial debut, the horror film Friday the 13th. Cunningham felt King embodied the qualities of the film's lead heroine, Alice Hardy, and he cast her in the film. Friday the 13th grossed nearly $60 million worldwide.

The following year, she reprised her role as Alice Hardy in the sequel Friday the 13th Part 2, in which the character meets her demise. After the success of Friday the 13th, King was pursued by a male stalker who managed to learn areas she frequented, where she exercised, and ate lunch. The man took Polaroid photographs of King that he would slip under the door of her apartment in New York City, and at one point, broke into her apartment and defaced her artwork. On one occasion, the man confronted her in her apartment and held a gun to her head. The assailant was apprehended and spent some time imprisoned, but the incident traumatized King, prompting her to leave the public eye. Her last on-camera screen appearance at that time was a commercial for Downy which she filmed in 1983. Subsequently, King was hired as a stunt performer and background actor for the Ivan Reitman film Ghostbusters (1984), having been acquainted with the stunt coordinator Cliff Cudney.

She subsequently relocated to London where she enrolled at the Royal Academy of Dramatic Art, studying voice and dance. Upon finishing her studies, she returned to the United States, settling in Los Angeles where she met her husband, Richard Hassanein, the founder of United Film Distribution. Reluctant to appear onscreen, King reemerged doing voice acting and ADR work, first for Mel Gibson's The Man Without a Face, and the Lasse Hallström-directed drama What's Eating Gilbert Grape? (both 1993). She continued to provide voice work for numerous Hollywood productions throughout the 1990's, including Philadelphia (1993), The Pelican Brief (1993), Wolf (1994), Cameron Crowe's Jerry Maguire (1996), and James Cameron's Titanic (1997). She would later state: "Voiceover work saved me. There's no question it came all around full circle, and I'm a better, more compassionate and stronger actor and artist."

2009–present: film and other projects
In 2009, she signed on to the science-fiction/horror film Psychic Experiment, marking her first onscreen film appearance in 27 years. In 2012, she starred in the Welsh Christmas horror film Silent Night, Bloody Night: The Homecoming, an unofficial sequel to the American horror film Silent Night, Bloody Night (1974) and The Butterfly Room. King is set to portray Jackie Winters, an investigative reporter, in the upcoming horror film William Froste and Theresa in the short film Admonition.

As of 2010, King also worked as a winemaker and wine company coordinator in southern Oregon. She has sold her own line of Friday the 13th-themed wines through the company, called Crystal Lake Wines, as well as paintings.

In 2021, King reprised her role as Alice Hardy in the medium-length horror film Jason Rising.

Filmography

Notes

References

Sources

External links

 
 Adrienne King on Myspace

1960 births
American child actresses
American female dancers
American film actresses
American voice actresses
American winemakers
American people of Czech descent
American people of English descent
American people of Hungarian-Jewish descent
Dancers from New York (state)
Living people
Actresses from New York (state)
Actresses from Oregon
People from Long Island
Alumni of RADA
21st-century American women